Steven R. Becker (born August 31, 1947) is an American politician who served as a Republican member for the 104th district in the Kansas House of Representatives from 2013 to 2019.

In the 2018 election, Becker was narrowly defeated by Paul Waggoner in the Republican primary. He left office in 2019.

References

1947 births
Living people
Republican Party members of the Kansas House of Representatives
21st-century American politicians
People from Reno County, Kansas
Hutchinson Community College alumni
Washburn University alumni